"Leaving Me Now" is a single released in 1985 by the British musical group Level 42.  It was the second single taken from their sixth studio album World Machine. The song is written by Mark King, Phil Gould and Wally Badarou. A slow, emotive ballad written about the end of a relationship, it contains a piano solo by Mike Lindup in the middle and at the end, though this is edited down for the single edit.

The single's cover art is the same as the next single "World Machine", and illustrates a hole in the sky. The single was released in many countries beyond the United Kingdom, including the United States, Germany, Australia, the Netherlands, Canada, Argentina, Japan and others.

Music video
This song has a music video directed by Nigel Dick.

Charts

References

Level 42 songs
Songs written by Mark King (musician)
Songs written by Phil Gould (musician)
1985 singles
Songs written by Wally Badarou
1985 songs
Polydor Records singles
Pop ballads